Shady Creek is a stream in Audrain and Pike Counties in the U.S. state of Missouri. It is a tributary of Indian Creek.

Shady Creek, historically also called "Shady Branch", was so named on account of the shade trees lining its banks.

See also
List of rivers of Missouri

References

Rivers of Audrain County, Missouri
Rivers of Pike County, Missouri
Rivers of Missouri